The 76th Massachusetts General Court, consisting of the Massachusetts Senate and the Massachusetts House of Representatives, met in 1855 during the governorship of Henry Gardner. Henry Wetherby Benchley served as president of the Senate and Daniel C. Eddy served as speaker of the House.

"Know-Nothings won all 40 state Senate seats and all but three of the 379 state House seats in 1854, in addition to the governorship.... Once in power, the Know-Nothings passed legislation to deport poor or mentally ill Irish residents; to 'inspect' Catholic schools and convents; and to order daily readings from the Protestant Bible in public schools."

On May 9, 1855, Joseph Hiss became the first Massachusetts state representative to be expelled from the House.

Notable legislation
This legislature passed the nation's first statute racially integrating public education.

Senators

Representatives

See also
 34th United States Congress
 List of Massachusetts General Courts

References

Further reading

External links
 
 

Political history of Massachusetts
Massachusetts legislative sessions
massachusetts
1855 in Massachusetts